Takydromus sexlineatus, the Asian grass lizard, six-striped long-tailed grass lizard, or long-tailed grass lizard, is an arboreal, diurnal species of lizard. The tail length is usually over three times the body (snout to vent) length in this species.

Males and females are similar, males being distinguishable by the presence of pre-anal pores. On average they grow to around  snout-to-vent length, with the addition of a distinctive, prehensile long tail. Some individuals may have small circular spots on the sides of the bodies. This species of lizard is often kept as a pet.

Like geckos they can drop their tail and grow a new one when attacked.

Appearance
The long-tailed grass lizard is easily identifiable by a long tail, and has a white to cream coloured underbelly with a brown, green or beige back, often adorned with brown stripes of different shades. It typically has a small head with a sharply pointed snout and black or pink tongue. Its body is slightly elongated and thin with small pointy scales beneath the chin resembling a beard. Males have white spots on their sides, while females do not. Males have tails that thicken past the vent and are generally thicker than the female's down the entire length of the tail. The light stripes on the length of the body are yellower than the female's, which are more cream coloured.  They grow up to 12 inches (30 cm.) long, with the tail usually being three times their body length.

Distribution

Takydromus sexlineatus is found throughout South East Asia, and is native to a number of countries including India, China, Thailand, and Indonesia. The subspecies ocellatus is found in areas such as southern China, north Burma and north Malaysia.

Behavior

These are entirely diurnal lizards that emerge in the early morning to bask in the sun. If a potential predator approaches they will first remain completely still, and then if the danger persists, they will flee to the safety of foliage. Both sexes use arm-waving gestures (similar to a front crawl swimming action), apparently to communicate with each other. They are very agile and fast.

Diet

Takydromus sexlineatus feeds on small insects such as flies, In captivity they can be reared on crickets and like other small lizards may require a calcium substitute. It is advisable in captivity to vary food including mealworms, sterile maggots or waxworms in addition to crickets. Unlike some larger reptiles, these lizards have extremely fast reactions and have been observed jumping into the air to catch flying prey such as flies.

References

Further reading
 Arnold, E. N. 1997 Interrelationships and evolution of the east Asian grass lizards, Takydromus (Squamata: Lacertidae). Zoological Journal of the Linnean Society 119 (2) February, 1997, p 267-296
 Daudin, F. M. 1802 Histoire Naturelle, génerale et particulièredes reptiles, ouvrage faisant suite, a l'histoiure naturelle, générale et particulière composée par LECLERC DE BUFFON, et redigée par C. S. SONNINI, vol. 3. F. Dufart, Paris.
 Ji, Xiang; Wenhui Zhou, Xiaodong Zhang and Huiqing Gu. 1998 Sexual dimorphism and reproduction in the grass lizard Takydromus septentrionalis. Russ. J. Herpetol. 5 (1): 44-48
 Lin, Si-Min; Chaolun Allen Chen and Kuang-Yang Lue 2002 Molecular Phylogeny and Biogeography of the Grass Lizards Genus Takydromus (Reptilia: Lacertidae) of East Asia. Molecular Phylogenetics and Evolution 22: 276-288 [erratum in 26: 333]
 Purser, Philip A. 2004 The Tiniest Dragon: The Oriental Long-Tailed Grass Lizard Takydromus sexlineatus. Reptilia (GB) (33): 67-71
 Schlüter, U. 2003 Die Langschwanzeidechsen der Gattung Takydromus. Kirschner & Seufer Verlag, 110 pp. [review in Draco 21: 91]
 Ziegler, Thomas, Wolfgang Böhme and Wolfgang Bischoff. 1999 Comments on the grass lizards (Lacertidae:Takydromus) of Vietnam and Myanmar. Hamadryad 24 (1): 39-42.

Takydromus
Reptiles of Southeast Asia
Reptiles of Thailand
Reptiles described in 1802
Taxa named by François Marie Daudin